Follitropin subunit beta also known as follicle-stimulating hormone beta subunit (FSH-B) is a protein that in humans is encoded by the FSHB gene.  Alternative splicing results in two transcript variants encoding the same protein.

Function 

The pituitary glycoprotein hormone family includes follicle-stimulating hormone, luteinizing hormone, chorionic gonadotropin, and thyroid-stimulating hormone. All of these glycoproteins consist of an identical alpha subunit and a hormone-specific beta subunit. This gene encodes the beta subunit of follicle-stimulating hormone. In conjunction with luteinizing hormone, follicle-stimulating hormone induces egg and sperm production.

References

Further reading